Roman Candles is a 1966 short film directed by John Waters and starring Divine, Mary Vivian Pearce, David Lochary, Mink Stole, and Maelcum Soul.

The film was shown "triple projected" on three 8mm projectors running simultaneously but was never released commercially.  However, since 2004 it has been screened occasionally as part of various John Waters touring art exhibitions.

Plot
The movie features random scenes of Maelcum Soul in nun habit drag, a priest drinking a beer, a woman being attacked with an electric fan, a drag queen riding a motorcycle, and Divine playing hide and seek. The soundtrack is played back from tape in the room during the screening, and includes radio advertisements, rock songs, a press conference with Lee Harvey Oswald's mother, and tune by the Shangri-Las.

Cast
Divine
Maelcum Soul
David Lochary
Mona Montgomery
Mary Vivian Pearce
Pat Moran
Mink Stole
Bob Skidmore
John Waters

See also
List of American films of 1966

References

External links

1966 films
1966 short films
American short films
Films directed by John Waters
American independent films
1960s English-language films
1960s American films